UFC Fight Night: Bisping vs. Le (also known as UFC Fight Night 48) was a mixed martial arts event held on August 23, 2014, at the CotaiArena in Macau.

Background
The event was headlined by a middleweight bout between Michael Bisping and Cung Le.

It was the third event that the organization had hosted in the CotaiArena following UFC on Fuel TV: Franklin vs. Le in November 2012 and The Ultimate Fighter China Finale: Kim vs. Hathaway in March 2014.

Also featured on the card was the featherweight final from The Ultimate Fighter: China between Ning Guangyou and Jianping Yang, which was originally expected to take place at The Finale for the inaugural season.

Dong Hyun Kim was expected to face Héctor Lombard at the event.  However, Lombard pulled out of the bout and was replaced by Tyron Woodley.

Alberto Mina was expected to face Sheldon Westcott at the event.  However, in the days leading up to the event, Westcott pulled out of the bout citing an injury and was replaced by Shinsho Anzai.

Results

Bonus awards
The following fighters were awarded $50,000 bonuses:
Fight of the Night: None awarded
 Performance of the Night: Michael Bisping, Tyron Woodley, Alberto Mina and Yuta Sasaki

See also
List of UFC events
2014 in UFC

References

UFC Fight Night
Mixed martial arts in Macau
2014 in Macau sport
2014 in mixed martial arts